Harry Bell may refer to:
 Henry Lawrie Bell (1929–1984), Australian ornithologist
 Harry Bell (footballer, born 1862) (1862–1948), English footballer for West Bromwich Albion
 Harry Bell (footballer, born 1924) (1924–2014), English footballer for Middlesbrough and Darlington and Minor Counties cricketer for Durham
 Harry Bell (Australian footballer) (1897–1980), Australian rules footballer
 Harry Bell (ice hockey) (1925–2009), defenceman who played for the New York Rangers
 Harry Bell (Medal of Honor) (1860–1938), Medal of Honor recipient
 Harry M. Bell, American football and basketball coach

See also
 Harold Bell (1919–2009), American marketer
 Henry Bell (disambiguation)